Pádraig Dunne (born 13 May 1962) is an Irish retired Gaelic footballer. His league and championship career with the Offaly senior team spanned fourteen seasons from 1981 to 1994.

Dunne made his senior debut for Offaly during the 1981 championship. Over the course of the next fourteen seasons he won one All-Ireland medal. Dunne also won two Leinster medals. He played his last game for Offaly in June 1994.

Honours
Gracefield
Offaly Senior Football Championship (1): 1984

Offaly
All-Ireland Senior Football Championship (1): 1982
Leinster Senior Football Championship (2): 1981, 1982

References

1962 births
Living people
Drinking establishment owners
Offaly inter-county Gaelic footballers
Winners of one All-Ireland medal (Gaelic football)